There are 37 known isotopes of radon (86Rn), from 195Rn to 231Rn; all are radioactive. The most stable isotope is 222Rn with a half-life of 3.823 days, which decays into . Five isotopes of radon, 217, 218, 219, 220, 222Rn occur in trace quantities in nature as decay products of, respectively, 217At, 218At, 223Ra, 224Ra, and 226Ra. 217Rn is produced in a rare branch in the decay chain of trace quantities of 237Np; 218Rn and 222Rn are intermediate steps in the decay chain for 238U; 219Rn is an intermediate step in the decay chain for 235U; and 220Rn occurs in the decay chain for 232Th.

List of isotopes 

|-
| 195Rn
|
| style="text-align:right" | 86
| style="text-align:right" | 109
| 195.00544(5)
| 6 ms
|
|
| 3/2−#
|
|-
| style="text-indent:1em" | 195mRn
|
| colspan="3" style="text-indent:2em" | 50(50) keV
| 6 ms
|
|
| 13/2+#
|
|-
| rowspan=2|196Rn
| rowspan=2|
| rowspan=2 style="text-align:right" | 86
| rowspan=2 style="text-align:right" | 110
| rowspan=2|196.002115(16)
| rowspan=2|4.7(11) ms[4.4(+13−9) ms]
| α
| 192Po
| rowspan=2|0+
| rowspan=2|
|-
| β+ (rare)
| 196At
|-
| rowspan=2|197Rn
| rowspan=2|
| rowspan=2 style="text-align:right" | 86
| rowspan=2 style="text-align:right" | 111
| rowspan=2|197.00158(7)
| rowspan=2|66(16) ms[65(+23−14) ms]
| α
| 193Po
| rowspan=2|3/2−#
| rowspan=2|
|-
| β+ (rare)
| 197At
|-
| rowspan=2 style="text-indent:1em" | 197mRn
| rowspan=2|
| rowspan=2 colspan="3" style="text-indent:2em" | 200(60)# keV
| rowspan=2|21(5) ms[19(+8−4) ms]
| α
| 193Po
| rowspan=2|(13/2+)
| rowspan=2|
|-
| β+ (rare)
| 197At
|-
| rowspan=2|198Rn
| rowspan=2|
| rowspan=2 style="text-align:right" | 86
| rowspan=2 style="text-align:right" | 112
| rowspan=2|197.998679(14)
| rowspan=2|65(3) ms
| α (99%)
| 194Po
| rowspan=2|0+
| rowspan=2|
|-
| β+ (1%)
| 198At
|-
| rowspan=2|199Rn
| rowspan=2|
| rowspan=2 style="text-align:right" | 86
| rowspan=2 style="text-align:right" | 113
| rowspan=2|198.99837(7)
| rowspan=2|620(30) ms
| α (94%)
| 195Po
| rowspan=2|3/2−#
| rowspan=2|
|-
| β+ (6%)
| 199At
|-
| rowspan=2 style="text-indent:1em" | 199mRn
| rowspan=2|
| rowspan=2 colspan="3" style="text-indent:2em" | 180(70) keV
| rowspan=2|320(20) ms
| α (97%)
| 195Po
| rowspan=2|13/2+#
| rowspan=2|
|-
| β+ (3%)
| 199At
|-
| rowspan=2|200Rn
| rowspan=2|
| rowspan=2 style="text-align:right" | 86
| rowspan=2 style="text-align:right" | 114
| rowspan=2|199.995699(14)
| rowspan=2|0.96(3) s
| α (98%)
| 196Po
| rowspan=2|0+
| rowspan=2|
|-
| β+ (2%)
| 200At
|-
| rowspan=2|201Rn
| rowspan=2|
| rowspan=2 style="text-align:right" | 86
| rowspan=2 style="text-align:right" | 115
| rowspan=2|200.99563(8)
| rowspan=2|7.0(4) s
| α (80%)
| 197Po
| rowspan=2|(3/2−)
| rowspan=2|
|-
| β+ (20%)
| 201At
|-
| rowspan=3 style="text-indent:1em" | 201mRn
| rowspan=3|
| rowspan=3 colspan="3" style="text-indent:2em" | 280(90)# keV
| rowspan=3|3.8(1) s
| α (90%)
| 197Po
| rowspan=3|(13/2+)
| rowspan=3|
|-
| β+ (10%)
| 201At
|-
| IT (<1%)
| 201Rn
|-
| rowspan=2|202Rn
| rowspan=2|
| rowspan=2 style="text-align:right" | 86
| rowspan=2 style="text-align:right" | 116
| rowspan=2|201.993263(19)
| rowspan=2|9.94(18) s
| α (85%)
| 198Po
| rowspan=2|0+
| rowspan=2|
|-
| β+ (15%)
| 202At
|-
| rowspan=2|203Rn
| rowspan=2|
| rowspan=2 style="text-align:right" | 86
| rowspan=2 style="text-align:right" | 117
| rowspan=2|202.993387(25)
| rowspan=2|44.2(16) s
| α (66%)
| 199Po
| rowspan=2|(3/2−)
| rowspan=2|
|-
| β+ (34%)
| 203At
|-
| rowspan=2 style="text-indent:1em" | 203mRn
| rowspan=2|
| rowspan=2 colspan="3" style="text-indent:2em" | 363(4) keV
| rowspan=2|26.7(5) s
| α (80%)
| 199Po
| rowspan=2|13/2(+)
| rowspan=2|
|-
| β+ (20%)
| 203At
|-
| rowspan=2|204Rn
| rowspan=2|
| rowspan=2 style="text-align:right" | 86
| rowspan=2 style="text-align:right" | 118
| rowspan=2|203.991429(16)
| rowspan=2|1.17(18) min
| α (73%)
| 200Po
| rowspan=2|0+
| rowspan=2|
|-
| β+ (27%)
| 204At
|-
| rowspan=2|205Rn
| rowspan=2|
| rowspan=2 style="text-align:right" | 86
| rowspan=2 style="text-align:right" | 119
| rowspan=2|204.99172(5)
| rowspan=2|170(4) s
| β+ (77%)
| 205At
| rowspan=2|5/2−
| rowspan=2|
|-
| α (23%)
| 201Po
|-
| rowspan=2|206Rn
| rowspan=2|
| rowspan=2 style="text-align:right" | 86
| rowspan=2 style="text-align:right" | 120
| rowspan=2|205.990214(16)
| rowspan=2|5.67(17) min
| α (62%)
| 202Po
| rowspan=2|0+
| rowspan=2|
|-
| β+ (38%)
| 206At
|-
| rowspan=2|207Rn
| rowspan=2|
| rowspan=2 style="text-align:right" | 86
| rowspan=2 style="text-align:right" | 121
| rowspan=2|206.990734(28)
| rowspan=2|9.25(17) min
| β+ (79%)
| 207At
| rowspan=2|5/2−
| rowspan=2|
|-
| α (21%)
| 203Po
|-
| style="text-indent:1em" | 207mRn
|
| colspan="3" style="text-indent:2em" | 899.0(10) keV
| 181(18) µs
|
|
| (13/2+)
|
|-
| rowspan=2|208Rn
| rowspan=2|
| rowspan=2 style="text-align:right" | 86
| rowspan=2 style="text-align:right" | 122
| rowspan=2|207.989642(12)
| rowspan=2|24.35(14) min
| α (62%)
| 204Po
| rowspan=2|0+
| rowspan=2|
|-
| β+ (38%)
| 208At
|-
| rowspan=2|209Rn
| rowspan=2|
| rowspan=2 style="text-align:right" | 86
| rowspan=2 style="text-align:right" | 123
| rowspan=2|208.990415(21)
| rowspan=2|28.5(10) min
| β+ (83%)
| 209At
| rowspan=2|5/2−
| rowspan=2|
|-
| α (17%)
| 205Po
|-
| style="text-indent:1em" | 209m1Rn
|
| colspan="3" style="text-indent:2em" | 1173.98(13) keV
| 13.4(13) µs
|
|
| 13/2+
|
|-
| style="text-indent:1em" | 209m2Rn
|
| colspan="3" style="text-indent:2em" | 3636.78(23) keV
| 3.0(3) µs
|
|
| (35/2+)
|
|-
| rowspan=2|210Rn
| rowspan=2|
| rowspan=2 style="text-align:right" | 86
| rowspan=2 style="text-align:right" | 124
| rowspan=2|209.989696(9)
| rowspan=2|2.4(1) h
| α (96%)
| 206Po
| rowspan=2|0+
| rowspan=2|
|-
| β+ (4%)
| 210At
|-
| style="text-indent:1em" | 210m1Rn
|
| colspan="3" style="text-indent:2em" | 1690(15) keV
| 644(40) ns
|
|
| 8+#
|
|-
| style="text-indent:1em" | 210m2Rn
|
| colspan="3" style="text-indent:2em" | 3837(15) keV
| 1.06(5) µs
|
|
| (17)−
|
|-
| style="text-indent:1em" | 210m3Rn
|
| colspan="3" style="text-indent:2em" | 6493(15) keV
| 1.04(7) µs
|
|
| (22)+
|
|-
| rowspan=2|211Rn
| rowspan=2|
| rowspan=2 style="text-align:right" | 86
| rowspan=2 style="text-align:right" | 125
| rowspan=2|210.990601(7)
| rowspan=2|14.6(2) h
| α (72.6%)
| 207Po
| rowspan=2|1/2−
| rowspan=2|
|-
| β+ (27.4%)
| 211At
|-
| rowspan=2|212Rn
| rowspan=2|
| rowspan=2 style="text-align:right" | 86
| rowspan=2 style="text-align:right" | 126
| rowspan=2|211.990704(3)
| rowspan=2|23.9(12) min
| α
| 208Po
| rowspan=2|0+
| rowspan=2|
|-
| β+β+ (rare)
| 212Po
|-
| 213Rn
|
| style="text-align:right" | 86
| style="text-align:right" | 127
| 212.993883(6)
| 19.5(1) ms
| α
| 209Po
| (9/2+)
|
|-
| rowspan=2|214Rn
| rowspan=2|
| rowspan=2 style="text-align:right" | 86
| rowspan=2 style="text-align:right" | 128
| rowspan=2|213.995363(10)
| rowspan=2|0.27(2) µs
| α
| 210Po
| rowspan=2|0+
| rowspan=2|
|-
| β+β+ (rare)
| 214Po
|-
| style="text-indent:1em" | 214mRn
|
| colspan="3" style="text-indent:2em" | 4595.4 keV
| 245(30) ns
|
|
| (22+)
|
|-
| 215Rn
|
| style="text-align:right" | 86
| style="text-align:right" | 129
| 214.998745(8)
| 2.30(10) µs
| α
| 211Po
| 9/2+
|
|-
| 216Rn
|
| style="text-align:right" | 86
| style="text-align:right" | 130
| 216.000274(8)
| 45(5) µs
| α
| 212Po
| 0+
|
|-
| 217Rn
|
| style="text-align:right" | 86
| style="text-align:right" | 131
| 217.003928(5)
| 0.54(5) ms
| α
| 213Po
| 9/2+
| Trace
|-
| 218Rn
|
| style="text-align:right" | 86
| style="text-align:right" | 132
| 218.0056013(25)
| 35(5) ms
| α
| 214Po
| 0+
| Trace
|-
| 219Rn
| ActinonActinium emanation
| style="text-align:right" | 86
| style="text-align:right" | 133
| 219.0094802(27)
| 3.96(1) s
| α
| 215Po
| 5/2+
| Trace
|-
| rowspan=2|220Rn
| rowspan=2|ThoronThorium emanation
| rowspan=2 style="text-align:right" | 86
| rowspan=2 style="text-align:right" | 134
| rowspan=2|220.0113940(24)
| rowspan=2|55.6(1) s
| α
| 216Po
| rowspan=2|0+
| rowspan=2|Trace
|-
| β−β− (rare)
| 220Ra
|-
| rowspan=2|221Rn
| rowspan=2|
| rowspan=2 style="text-align:right" | 86
| rowspan=2 style="text-align:right" | 135
| rowspan=2|221.015537(6)
| rowspan=2|25.7(5) min
| β− (78%)
| 221Fr
| rowspan=2|7/2(+)
| rowspan=2|
|-
| α (22%)
| 217Po
|-
| 222Rn
| RadonRadium emanationEmanationEmanonNiton
| style="text-align:right" | 86
| style="text-align:right" | 136
| 222.0175777(25)
| 3.8235(3) d
| α
| 218Po
| 0+
| Trace
|-
| 223Rn
|
| style="text-align:right" | 86
| style="text-align:right" | 137
| 223.02179(32)#
| 24.3(4) min
| β−
| 223Fr
| 7/2
|
|-
| 224Rn
|
| style="text-align:right" | 86
| style="text-align:right" | 138
| 224.02409(32)#
| 107(3) min
| β−
| 224Fr
| 0+
|
|-
| 225Rn
|
| style="text-align:right" | 86
| style="text-align:right" | 139
| 225.02844(32)#
| 4.66(4) min
| β−
| 225Fr
| 7/2−
|
|-
| 226Rn
|
| style="text-align:right" | 86
| style="text-align:right" | 140
| 226.03089(43)#
| 7.4(1) min
| β−
| 226Fr
| 0+
|
|-
| 227Rn
|
| style="text-align:right" | 86
| style="text-align:right" | 141
| 227.03541(45)#
| 20.8(7) s
| β−
| 227Fr
| 5/2(+#)
|
|-
| 228Rn
|
| style="text-align:right" | 86
| style="text-align:right" | 142
| 228.03799(44)#
| 65(2) s
| β−
| 228Fr
| 0+
|
|-
| 229Rn
|
| style="text-align:right" | 86
| style="text-align:right" | 143
| 229.0426536(141)
| 12(1) s
| β−
| 229Fr
|
|
|-
| 230Rn
|
| style="text-align:right" | 86
| style="text-align:right" | 144
| 
| 
| β−
| 230Fr
| 0+
|
|-
| 231Rn
|
| style="text-align:right" | 86
| style="text-align:right" | 145
| 
| 
| β−
| 231Fr
| 
|

References 

 Isotope masses from:

 Isotopic compositions and standard atomic masses from:

 Half-life, spin, and isomer data selected from the following sources.

 
Radon
Radon